Karow or Karów may refer to::

Karow, Mecklenburg-Vorpommern, Germany
Karow, Saxony-Anhalt, Germany
Karow (Berlin), a district in the borough of Pankow in Berlin
Karów, Poland
Marty Karow (1904-1986), All-American college football player and professional baseball player

See also

Karlow (name)